Vladimir Latin (born 30 May 1985 in Narva) is an Estonian rower. He is a member of rowing club "SK Narva Energia" located in Narva. He finished 9th in the men's quadruple sculls at the 2008 Summer Olympics. His younger brother is triathlete Aleksandr Latin.

Rowing World Cup

References 

 
 

1985 births
Living people
Estonian male rowers
Sportspeople from Narva
Olympic rowers of Estonia
Rowers at the 2008 Summer Olympics
Estonian people of Russian descent
European Rowing Championships medalists